Freedom of religion in North Korea is officially a right in North Korea. North Korea is considered an atheist state, where it is reported that the government continues to interfere with individual's ability to practice a religion, even though the Constitution guarantees "freedom of religious beliefs." The regime reportedly continues to repress the religious activities of unauthorized religious groups. Recent refugee, defector, missionary, and non-governmental organizations (NGOs) indicate that religious persons engaging in proselytizing in the country, those who have ties to overseas evangelical groups operating across the border in the People's Republic of China, and specifically, those repatriated from China and found to have been in contact with foreigners or missionaries, have been arrested and subjected to harsh penalties. Refugees and defectors continued to allege that they witnessed the arrests and execution of members of underground Christian churches by the regime in prior years. Due to the country's inaccessibility and the inability to gain timely information, this activity remains difficult to verify.

Religion in North Korea

Traditionally, religion in North Korea primarily consisted of Buddhism and Confucianism and to a lesser extent Shamanism. Since the arrival of Northern and Eastern Europeans in the 18th century, there is also a Christian minority. Syncretic Chondogyo emerged more recently.

Status of religious freedom

North Korea sees organised religious activity, except that which is supervised by officially recognized groups linked to the Government, as a potential pretext to challenging the leadership and social order. Religion many times is practiced in secret.

The government deals harshly with all opponents, and those engaged in unsanctioned religious activities often face the harshest of treatment. In particular, those of Christian faith are persecuted the most, and North Korea is ranked as the worst country in the world in terms of Christian persecution by international Catholic aid organization Aid to the Church in Need.

, an estimated 150,000 to 200,000 people were believed to be held in political prison camps (Kwalliso) which are located in remote areas of North Korea, many for religious and political reasons. The number of Christians in prison camps is estimated to be in the tens of thousands. Family members of believers are considered guilty by association and sent to labor camps or prisons.

Punishable religious activities include propagating religion, possessing religious items, praying, singing hymns, and having contact with religious persons.

In March 2006, the Government reportedly sentenced Son Jong-nam to death for espionage. However, some NGOs claimed that the sentence against Son was based on his contacts with Christian groups in China, his proselytizing activities, and his alleged sharing of information with his brother in South Korea. Son's brother reported that information indicated that Son was alive as of spring 2007. Because the country effectively bars outside observers from investigating such reports, it was not possible to verify the Government's claims about Son Jong-nam's activities or determine whether he had been executed. A fellow inmate of the Pyongyang prison where Son was held states that he died there in December 2008. In 2013, the South Korean newspaper JoongAng Ilbo reported that North Koreans in Wonsan discovered in possession of a Bible were among a group of 80 North Koreans killed in a wave of mass executions in the country. Others in the group were executed for other "relatively light transgressions such as watching South Korean movies or distributing pornography." However, others have testified in interviews that North Korean citizens have full rights to own and use religious texts and worship at church, although there may not be many young believers.

According to Alejandro Cao de Benós, Special Delegate of North Korea's Committee for Cultural Relations with Foreign Countries, the government allows only religions that are considered "traditional" in Korea, such as Christianity, Buddhism or Cheondoism.

Religion in politics

Historically, there has only been two openly religious parties at the Supreme People's Assembly, the former Korea Buddhist Federation and the current Chondoist Chongu Party, which has been in the Assembly since 1948. There are other religious organization such as the Korean Christian Federation, founded by Christians that joined the communist administration during the division of Korea,  or the North Korean Council of Religionists.

See also

Religion in North Korea
Human rights in North Korea

References

External links
 Research On Religion | Darren Slade on Missionizing North Korea
 2018 Report on International Religious Freedom: Democratic People’s Republic of Korea, U.S. Department of State.

North Korea
Human rights in North Korea
Religion in North Korea
Persecution of Christians